The Ambassador of Australia to Indonesia  is an officer of the Australian Department of Foreign Affairs and Trade and the head of the Embassy of the Commonwealth of Australia to the Republic of Indonesia. The position has the rank and status of an Ambassador Extraordinary and Plenipotentiary and the Embassy in Jakarta is Australia's largest embassy and one of Australia's most important overseas posts. The Embassy is assisted in their work by Consulates in Bali (since 1981), Makassar (since 2016) and Surabaya (since 2017).

The current ambassador, since April 2021, is Penny Williams.

Posting history

On 30 August 1933 the Minister for Commerce, Frederick Stewart, secured Cabinet approval for the establishment of several Trade Commissions in the East, with Batavia in the Netherlands East Indies being one of the most likely locations. However a decision to appoint a commissioner was delayed pending the report of the Australian Eastern Mission, Attorney General and Minister for External Affairs John Latham's fact-finding mission to the Far East, which found a dire need for Australian trade representative to improve mercantile connections in the region. Following Latham's return the Australian Government agreed to appoint a new Trade Commissioner, and the appointment of Charles Edward Critchley to Batavia, alongside appointments to Tokyo and Shanghai, was announced on 7 June 1935 by acting Prime Minister Earle Page. Arriving in September, Critchley met with Governor-General Bonifacius Cornelis de Jonge and set up offices in the Chartered Bank Building in Tambora, Old Batavia. In January 1938, Critchley was succeeded by Herbert Anton Peterson, who was given the new title of "Australian Government Commissioner", which was changed to remove confusion that the "Trade Commissioner" was merely a commercial representative. Commissioner Peterson served until escaping to Australia a few days after the Japanese invasion of Java in 1942.

Early Australian arrangements to establish diplomatic relations with Indonesia after the Indonesian proclamation of Independence on 17 August 1945 were complicated by the British and Dutch involvement in military activities in Indonesia in the next few years. Australia was dissuaded from establishing a consulate-general in Batavia in 1945 and instead sent a political representative to be attached to the Allied Forces, Netherlands East Indies (AFNEI), the command controlling areas of the Dutch East Indies liberated from Japanese forces. William Macmahon Ball, the Australian Political Representative to the AFNEI, arrived in Batavia on 7 November 1945 and returned to Australia in December 1945. In March 1946 the Department of External Affairs appointed Alfred Deakin Brookes as the new Political Representative. However, his departure in early June, owing to ill health, coincided with the arrival of Justice Richard Kirby, who acted as Political Representative in his absence before returning to Australia on 28 July 1946. Bertram Ballard was appointed as Australian Political Representative with AFNEI on 16 August 1946, as political representative Ballard was advised by Minister for External Affairs, Herbert Evatt directed him to establish informal relations with the Indonesians and to act as Australia's de facto representative to the republican government in Jogjakarta.

The post of Consul-General was created following the departure of AFNEI in late 1946 following the Indonesia-Dutch settlement, and Ballard was formally appointed Consul-General on 5 December 1946 and accredited by the Netherlands East Indies Government on 12 February 1947. He held this appointment until September 1947 when Charles Eaton, the former Consul to Portuguese Timor, replaced him. In April 1950, the Consulate-General in Jakarta was raised to the status of an embassy, with the first Australian Ambassador to Indonesia, John Hood, appointed by External Affairs Minister Percy Spender.

List of heads of mission

 : Woolcott was Australian ambassador in Jakarta when difficulties over developments in Portuguese Timor, later Timor Leste, came to a head.
 : There was initially a slight delay in Jakarta before Ritchie's appointment was approved. This was reportedly because of some concerns in the Indonesian Parliament about the possible approach that Ritchie might take towards Indonesian policy in Papua in responding to problems of regional conflict in the province.
 : On 29 April 2015 the Australian Prime Minister Tony Abbott announced that Grigson would be recalled to Canberra for consultations following the execution of two Australians in Indonesia who had been convicted of drug smuggling. Grigson returned to his post in Jakarta in early June after being in Canberra for consultations for about six weeks.
 : In early April 2020, Quinlan temporarily relocated to Australia because of his vulnerability to COVID-19 infections. He was expected to continue to oversee Australian embassy operations in Jakarta from Canberra.

Consuls-General

Bali

Makassar

Surabaya

See also
 Australia–Indonesia relations
 Embassy of Australia, Jakarta
 Embassy of Indonesia, Canberra
 Indonesian ambassadors to Australia
 Australian Consulate-General, Surabaya
 Consuls-General of Australia

References

External links
Australian Embassy, Indonesia
Australian Consulate-General, Makassar
Australian Consulate-General, Surabaya

Australia
 
Indonesia